Atascadero Unified School District is a public school district based in San Luis Obispo County, California.

Schools
The following schools are within the Atascadero Unified School District.
 Atascadero High School
 Atascadero Middle School
 Atascadero Fine Arts Academy
 Carrisa Plains Elementary School
 Creston Elementary School
 Monterey Road Elementary School
 San Benito Elementary School
 San Gabriel Elementary School
 Santa Margarita Elementary School
 Santa Rosa Academic Academy
 Paloma Creek High School (Continuation)
 West Mall Alternative High School

References

External links
 

Atascadero, California
School districts in San Luis Obispo County, California